Che Chi Man (born 7 August 1975) is a Macanese footballer who plays as a midfielder. He currently plays for G.D. Lam Pak in the Campeonato da 1ª Divisão do Futebol.

References

External links 

1975 births
Living people
Macau footballers
Macau international footballers
G.D. Lam Pak players
Association football midfielders